Marco Antonio Camargo González (born May 8, 1989) is an Ecuadorian swimmer, who specialized in butterfly events. He won a bronze medal in the 200 m butterfly at the 2006 FINA Youth World Swimming Championships in Rio de Janeiro, Brazil, and eventually represented his nation Ecuador at the 2008 Summer Olympics, placing himself among the top swimmers in the 100  and 200 m butterfly. 

Camargo was invited by FINA under the Universality rule to compete as a 19-year-old for Ecuador in the men's 100 m butterfly at the 2008 Summer Olympics in Beijing.

References

External links
NBC Olympics Profile

1989 births
Living people
Ecuadorian male swimmers
Olympic swimmers of Ecuador
Swimmers at the 2008 Summer Olympics
Male butterfly swimmers
Sportspeople from Guayaquil
21st-century Ecuadorian people